Anterrieux is a commune in the Cantal department in the Auvergne region of southern central France.

Geography
Anterrieux is located some 30 km south by south-west of Saint-Flour and 20 km west by north-west of Saint-Chely-d'Apcher. Access to the commune is by road D989 from Saint-Chely-d'Apcher in the east passing through the commune and continuing west to Chaudes-Aigues. Access to the village is by small communal roads from various points on the D989. In addition to the village there is also the hamlet of Oyex in the south. The commune is mixed forest and farmland with an especially large forest (the Bois d'Oyex) in the far south of the commune.

The Bes river forms the south-eastern border of the commune as it flows north to join La Truyere river in the Lac de Grandval. The Maleval river rises in the commune and flows north past the village. It is joined by several tributaries in the commune.

Neighbouring communes and villages

History
The region was the scene of fighting in June 1944 between the Maquis and Nazi troops. The Nazis were successful in overrunning the Maquis in their Truyère Redoubt where they were attacked on 20 June 1944. The battle was fierce and the village of Anterrieux was destroyed by fire after having been held for ten hours by the 3,000 resistance fighters of the 7th Company under the command of Henri Fournier who were forced to disperse because of the German firepower supported by their air force. More than a hundred maquisards were killed as well as about fifteen German soldiers and a dozen civilians. The Resistance Museum of Anterrieux provides the public with memories of that time.

See: John Hind Farmer

Administration

List of Successive Mayors

Population

See also
Communes of the Cantal department

References

External links
Anterrieux on the National Geographic Institute website 
Anterrieux on Géoportail, National Geographic Institute (IGN) website 
Anterrieux on the 1750 Cassini Map

Communes of Cantal